The 1985 Laurence Olivier Awards were presented by the Society of London Theatre in 1985 at the Dominion Theatre in London, celebrating excellence in West End theatre. It was broadcast by BBC Television, though the broadcast date and specific BBC station is not availablethe 2003 Oliviers, for example, aired on BBC Two the evening after the live event.

Winners and nominees
Details of winners (in bold) and nominees, in each award category, per the Society of London Theatre.

Productions with multiple nominations and awards
The following 18 productions, including one ballet and two operas, received multiple nominations:

 4: Les Misérables and Love's Labour's Lost
 3: A Chorus of Disapproval, Pravda, Richard III and The Winter's Tale
 2: Donnerstag aus Licht, Faust, Henry V, Lennon, Martine, Me and My Girl, The Crucible, The Mysteries, The Playboy of the Western World, The Road to Mecca, The Sons of Horus and Torch Song Trilogy

The following three productions received multiple awards:

 3: A Chorus of Disapproval
 2: Me and My Girl and The Mysteries

See also
 39th Tony Awards

References

External links
 Previous Olivier Winners – 1985

Laurence Olivier Awards ceremonies
Laurence Olivier Awards, 1985
Laurence Olivier Awards
Laurence Olivier Awards